A transition constraint is a way of enforcing that the data does not enter an impossible state because of a previous state. For example, it should not be possible for a person to change from being "married" to being "single, never married". The only valid states after "married" might be "divorced", "widowed", or "deceased".

This is the database-centric interpretation of the term.

In formal models in computer security, a transition constraint is a property that governs every valid transition from a state of the model to a successor state.  It can be viewed as complementary to the state criteria that pertain to states per se but have no bearing on transitions between successive states.

References
 Modelling Transition Constraints (ResearchIndex)

Data modeling